The 2005–06 Spartan South Midlands Football League season is the 9th in the history of Spartan South Midlands Football League a football competition in England.

Premier Division

The Premier Division featured 17 clubs which competed in the division last season, along with three new clubs:

Biggleswade United, promoted from Division One
Oxford City, relegated from the Southern Football League
Oxhey Jets, promoted from Division One

Also, Haywood United changed name to Aylesbury Vale.

League table

Division One

Division One featured 14 clubs which competed in the division last season, along with three new clubs:

Bedford United & Valerio, relegated from the Premier Division
Dunstable Town 98, promoted from Division Two
Hoddesdon Town, relegated from the Premier Division

League table

Division Two

Division Two featured 15 clubs which competed in the division last season, along with three new clubs:
Aston Clinton
M K Scot
Tring Corinthians

Also, Padbury B T F C changed name to Padbury United.

League table

References

External links
 FCHD Spartan South Midlands Football League page

2005–06
9